() is a Japanese-Chinese fantasy anime series produced by Yun Zhensong, Jian Liyang, Juan Wang, Zhi Jiehan and Sayako Muramatsu. Its 52 episodes were aired from July 26, 2019, to October 1, 2020.

Plot
After his family was kidnapped from Boo Boo Island by King Bozo during a freak accident in the Egg Islands (based on Japan and China), Dash had gained the ability to transform into cars and use elements powers. Dash must find the elements to defeat the dark king Bozo once and for all. He must defeat Bozo's minions and the Iron Gang also appeared before he collects elements. Should Dash's quest results in failure, Egg Island will be exterminated and his family and the Egg Cars will be killed.

Characters


A human boy who living in Boo Boo Island. He has the ability to transform into various cars


A hedgehog/car hybrid from Poka Poka Island. He is allergic to peppers.


A girl who looks for Dash. Her enemies were spiders.


A giraffe/car hybrid from Poka Poka Island who is a childhood friend.


Bozo's minions who plans to kill Dash.

References

External links
 Official anime website (TV Tokyo) 
 Official anime website (CCTV) 

2019 Chinese television series debuts
2019 anime television series debuts
2020 Chinese television series endings
2020 Japanese television series endings
Japanese children's animated fantasy television series
China Central Television original programming